John James Tallmadge (January 10, 1818 – October 16, 1873) was the 17th mayor of Milwaukee, Wisconsin, and one of the founders of the Milwaukee Chamber of Commerce.

Biography
Tallmadge was born on January 10, 1818, in Claverack, New York. He was the seventh of eight children born to James Tallmadge and Anne West Tallmadge.  At age 16, he was hired as a clerk at a dry goods store in Lyons, New York, where he was educated in business.  He became involved in the transportation business in Albany, New York, and later moved his company to Buffalo.

From Buffalo, he moved to Milwaukee in 1855 as an agent for the Western Transportation Company.  He became a prominent businessman in Milwaukee and was one of the founders of the Milwaukee Chamber of Commerce.  He was elected the first President of that organization in 1863.

His success as President of the Chamber of Commerce led to his election as Mayor of Milwaukee in 1865.  The day of the inauguration of Mayor Tallmadge happened to coincide with the news of the assassination of Abraham Lincoln, thus Tallmadge's first act as Mayor was to proclaim a symbolic funeral procession through Milwaukee, held on April 20, 1865.

He was re-elected as Mayor in 1866. After leaving office, in 1867, he was the Democratic Party nominee for Governor of Wisconsin in the 1867 gubernatorial election.  In the election, Tallmadge was defeated by incumbent Republican Governor and Civil War hero Lucius Fairchild.

After the gubernatorial election, Tallmadge retired from politics and spent the remainder of his years focused on his business interests.  In 1869, Tallmadge was one of the founding signatories of the incorporation of the Northwestern National Insurance Company in Milwaukee.

Family and personal life

Tallmadge married Harriet Jacobs on January 3, 1840.  They had six children, of which four survived to adulthood.

John J. Tallmadge was a descendant of early American settler Thomas Talmadge, who came to the Massachusetts Bay Colony in 1631.  The Tallmadge family produced many notable businessmen, military officers, and public officeholders in 18th and 19th century America.  Nathaniel P. Tallmadge, who had been Governor of the Wisconsin Territory in 1844 and 1845, was his first cousin, once removed.

Tallmadge died on October 16, 1873, in Summit, Waukesha County, Wisconsin.

References

People from Claverack, New York
Mayors of Milwaukee
Wisconsin Democrats
1818 births
1873 deaths
19th-century American politicians